Olshausen is a surname. Notable people with the surname include:

Hermann Olshausen (1796–1839), German theologian
Justus Olshausen (1800–1882), German orientalist
Theodor Olshausen (1802–1869), German author, journalist, and politician

German-language surnames